Laurence Gaughran (b Lobinstown 24 September 1842 -  d Mullingar 14 June 1928) was the Roman Catholic Bishop of Meath, Ireland from 1906 until his death.

Gaughran was educated at St Finian's College, Navan and St Patrick's College, Maynooth. He was ordained 2 June 1868.  He was Head teacher of St Finian's College, Mullingar from 1872 to 1877; Parish Priest of Mullingar from  1877 to 1885; Pastor of Kells in 1885; Vicar-General of Meath from 1886 until his appointment as bishop. He is buried in the grounds of his cathedral.

References

External links
 Website of the Diocese of Meath

1842 births
1928 deaths
Roman Catholic bishops of Meath
People from County Meath
Alumni of St Patrick's College, Maynooth
People educated at St Finian's College